College athletics encompasses non-professional, collegiate and university-level competitive sports and games.

World University Games 

The first World University Games were held in 1923. There were originally called the Union Nationale des Étudiants Français. In 1957, following several previous renames, they became known in English as the World University Games.

Continents and countries

North America

United States 

College athletics is a major enterprise in the United States, with more than 500,000 student athletes attending over 1,100 universities and colleges competing annually. The largest programs are:

 National Collegiate Athletic Association (NCAA) 
 National Association of Intercollegiate Athletics (NAIA)  
 National Junior College Athletic Association (NJCAA).

Among many other sports, the most-watched competitions are college football and college basketball, though there are competitions in many other sports, including badminton, baseball, softball, ice hockey, soccer, rugby union, volleyball, lacrosse, field hockey, cricket, handball, swimming and diving, track and field, golf, tennis, table tennis, pickleball, rowing, and many others depending on the university. In the United States, college athletes are considered amateurs and their compensation is generally limited to athletic scholarships. However, there is disagreement as to whether college student-athletes should be paid. College athletics have been criticized for diverting resources away from academic studies, while unpaid student athletes generate income for their universities and private entities. Due to the passage of Title IX in the United States, universities must offer an equal number of scholarships for women and for men.

Canada 
Canada has over 14,000 student athletes within 56 universities under U Sports. U Sports is the national sport governing body of university sport in Canada. There are 12 different sports annually that compete at 21 national championships throughout the year. Similarly to the USA, compensation is limited to athletic scholarships. There are athletic scholarships that are awarded to student athletes based on academic eligibility and athletic ability.  There is a minimum academic requirement for student athletes to achieve the scholarship. There is an amount cap on scholarships which varies between sports. Athletic scholarships are not only determined by the league caps but it varies on the institution, team, and coaches standard. Each student athlete that competes under U Sports has five years of eligibility and must complete 3.0 credits every year prior to competing. There are other sports that compete at the university level but do not fall under the U Sports.  These sports may be legislated by the conferences including - Canada West (CanWest), Ontario University Athletics (OUA), Quebec Student Sport Federation (RSEQ), and Atlantic University Sport (AUS). Colleges in Canada compete under the Canadian College Athletic Association (CCAA).

Latin America

Mexico 
Some Mexican universities are affiliated with professional association football teams. One such team is the Universidad Autonoma Pumas.

Oceania

Australia 
UniSport Nationals is an annual multi-sport event held in Australia among its 43 member universities and tertiary institutions. Over 7000 university students participate in the event each year. Compared to the NCAA in the US and USports in Canada however, UniSport Nationals is less competitive and comparable to intramural-level of competition.  

Historically, university sports has received little academic attention in Australia.
In 1863, rugby union was first played in Australia at the University of Sydney when several clubs affiliated with the university were established.
One of Australia's earliest cricket teams was founded at the University of Sydney in 1854. This university affiliated team is one of the only teams from that period that still exists.

New Zealand 
New Zealand universities's sports teams normally compete in local sports leagues against non-university teams. There is an annual national event which covers a large number of sports and competitive cultural activities (such as debating). The event is typically held over Easter, rotating around university centers.

Asia

East Asia

China 
University sport was established in China by the 1930s. One of these programs was at the Catholic University of Peking. In 1936, members of the team traveled to Japan as members of a team to participate in a basketball and association football competition. During the early stages of World War II in the region, most universities suspended their sports programs. The exceptions were Fu Ren University and Yanjing University which kept these programmes open until 1942 before shutting them down.

Chinese universities organised boat races before the cultural revolution. These races were modeled after the boat races in England.

The Chinese Basketball University Association (CUBA) is currently China's most popular and competitive collegiate basketball league. In 2018, AliSports acquired the rights to broadcast the league for $150 million. Other university sports associations such as the Chinese Football University Association and the Chinese Marathon University Association are being broadcast by AliSports.

Japan 
University sports was established in Japan by the 1930s.
By 1977, ultimate Frisbee had been established as a university sport. National championships were held that year with Aichi Gakuin University winning the inaugural event.

South Korea 
Collegiate sports are organized by the Korea University Sports Federation (KUSF) and students must be enrolled at a member institution in order to participate. It runs the U-League in six sports (baseball, basketball, football, soft tennis and volleyball) and the Club Championship in four team sports (baseball, basketball, football and volleyball). The U-League is mirrored after the domestic professional leagues and a large number of student-athletes eventually turn professional. The Club Championship is contested by college teams operated as intramural clubs.

Southeast Asia

Philippines 
 University Athletic Association of the Philippines
 National Collegiate Athletic Association (Philippines)
 Cebu Schools Athletic Foundation, Inc.

Indonesia 
 Liga Mahasiswa

South Asia

India 
 Maulana Abul Kalam Azad Trophy

Africa

South Africa 
Varsity Sports (South Africa) is an organization of university sports leagues in South Africa. The organization currently sponsors seven events: athletics, beach volleyball, association football, field hockey, netball, and rugby sevens.

During the 1970s, the National Union of South African Students worked to create a university sports program where race was not considered in team and competition arrangements. The organisation faced some governmental hurdles. At the time, inter-racial sports was only allowed to be played on private grounds, which meant games and competitions could not be played on public university grounds. They had models from the University of Witwatersrand and the University of Cape Town which had already held such events.

Europe

Western Europe

United Kingdom 

British Universities and Colleges Sport (BUCS) is the governing body for university and college sports in the UK. It runs leagues in 16 sports and an annual championship meeting, which in 2011 covered 19 sports. BUCS organization is very different from the USA's NCAA in the sense that BUCS is not competitive to compete in like the NCAA.

BUCS Super Rugby is the top competition for university-level rugby in the United Kingdom. Currently, there are 10 universities that compete in BUCS Super Rugby.

There were undergraduate boat races in Victorian England, and The Boat Race between Oxford and Cambridge is still an annual event. The assimilation of sports into academic life at Cambridge University in the nineteenth century has also been documented.

In the 1990s, ultimate frisbee became a popular sport on university campuses, leading to the establishment of a national sport federation.

Universities in Wales support national development of athletics. The Wales National Pool at Swansea University provides for a high level development of swimming.

Eastern Europe

Armenia 

The Armenian Student Sports Federation (ARMSSF) is a national non-governmental organization responsible for advocating, supporting and promoting the interests of students' sports and physical activities in Armenia. The headquarters of the federation is located in Yerevan. The Federation maintains numerous cooperation agreements with universities across Armenia.

The Federation is responsible for sending student athletes to participate in various international and European level university sporting championships, including the World University Summer & Winter Games, the FISU World University Championships, and the Pan-European Student Games. The ARMSSF also organizes national events, competitions, and activities for students across Armenia and often collaborates with other sporting federations such as the Armenian Table Tennis Federation, the Armwrestling Federation of Armenia, the Armenian National Rowing and Canoe Federation, and the Figure Skating Federation of Armenia, among others.

The ARMSSF organizes the annual "Student Sports Games of the Republic of Armenia". In November 2014, over 3500 students from 21 Armenian universities participated. The games are sponsored by the Ministry of Education and Science.

See also

 Universiade
Youth sports

References

University and college sports
Under-23 sport